"Who's Crying Now" is a song by the American rock band Journey. It was written by Jonathan Cain and Steve Perry. It was released in 1981 as the first single from Escape and reached No. 4 on both the Billboard Hot 100 and the Mainstream Rock Tracks charts. The song charted at No. 46 in the UK Singles Chart, and was the band's highest charting single in the UK until "Don't Stop Believin'" (also released as a single from the Escape album in 1981) incurred a resurgence in UK popularity in 2009.

The song is highlighted by Steve Perry's lyrics (with vocal riffs highly reminiscent of Sam Cooke) and piano playing by Jonathan Cain which segues into a bass riff by Ross Valory, and  other guitars.

Background

Singer Steve Perry said the chorus popped into his head while driving to Los Angeles, which he recorded on his personal mini cassette player. Once he arrived in LA, he went straight to keyboardist Jonathan Cain's house to show him the work in progress. Perry had come up with most of the melodies and rhythms, but was stumped on the lyrics. Cain helped write most of the verses.

At the end of the song, Neal Schon plays a repeating guitar solo that sounds similar to Santana. According to Schon on In the Studio with Redbeard (which devoted an entire episode to the making of Escape), originally he recorded an aggressive, experimental guitar solo which he liked but Perry and Cain did not. He then recorded a second solo, the "simplest thing he could play off the top of his head" as recalled by Perry. That one was appreciated much more by the rest of the band.  Steve Smith's drumming is only found in the choruses and towards the end of the song.

Reception
Billboard praised "Who's Crying Now" as "one of Journey's strongest and classiest records," and "one of the most appealing love songs" of 1981.  Record World said the song spotlights "haunting vocals" and "icy keyboards."

Cover version(s)
R&B singer Randy Crawford recorded a soulful version on her 1992 album Through the Eyes of Love.  Her cover of this song also features jazz pianist Joe Sample of The Crusaders.

Charts

Weekly charts

Year-end charts

References

Journey (band) songs
1981 singles
Songs written by Steve Perry
Songs written by Jonathan Cain
Song recordings produced by Mike Stone (record producer)
1981 songs
Columbia Records singles